Lee R. Raymond (born August 13, 1938) is an American businessman and was the chief executive officer (CEO) and chairman of ExxonMobil from 1999 to 2005. He had previously been the CEO of Exxon since 1993. He joined the company in 1963 and served as president from 1987 and a director beginning in 1984.

While at Exxon, Raymond was one of the most outspoken executives in the United States against regulation to curtail global warming. While casting doubt on climate change in public, internal Exxon research pointed to the role of human activity in climate change and the dangers of climate change which was characterized in the PBS Frontline three-part documentary "The Power of Big Oil".

Early life and education 
Lee Raymond was born in Watertown, South Dakota on August 13, 1938. He graduated from Watertown High School in 1956. Raymond received a bachelor's degree in chemical engineering from the University of Wisconsin–Madison in 1960. Raymond went on to earn his PhD in Chemical Engineering from the University of Minnesota.  He was awarded an honorary doctorate from the same university in 2001.  Raymond met his wife, Charlene née Hocevar, while studying at the University of Wisconsin–Madison; she was pursuing and later earned a degree in journalism.

Career
Raymond began working for Exxon in 1963. Raymond became a director of Exxon in 1984 and in 1987 he became the President of the company. In 1993, he became CEO succeeding Lawrence G. Rawl and held this post until 2005. He negotiated the merger with Mobil that became effective on January 1, 2000 and gave birth to the new ExxonMobil company. In 2003, when approaching the age of 65, the mandatory retirement age for executives at ExxonMobil, the board of directors requested him to stay in his position two more years, in order to prepare his succession, after the post-merger reorganisation period. On August 14, 2005, Raymond announced that he would retire at the end of 2005 as ExxonMobil's Chairman and CEO, two years later than the usual mandatory retirement age of 65 for the company executives. ExxonMobil president Rex W. Tillerson succeeded Raymond on 1 January 2006. On April 14, 2006, it was reported that Raymond's retirement package was worth about $400 million, the largest in history for a U.S. public company. However, the majority of that sum consisted of retirement-independent salary, bonuses, stock options, and restricted stock awards from his final year and prior years that, while high, are not unprecedented among major American CEOs. Retirement-specific payments in accordance with the standard pension plan provided to all ExxonMobil employees totaled around $100 million, calculated based on his over forty years of service and his salary upon retirement. Raymond was also chair of the National Petroleum Council (NPC), when it was asked to produce a report on the future of oil supply and demand.

Raymond was one of the most outspoken executives in the United States against regulation to curtail global warming.  In the 1990s, Raymond claimed that the scientific evidence for climate change was “inconclusive” and that “the case for global warming is far from air tight.”

After retiring from Exxon, Raymond was hired in 2005 as lead independent director for JPMorgan Chase. In 2020, amid pressure to remove Raymond from the board due to his history on climate change, JPMorgan Chase removed Raymond as lead independent director of JPMorgan Chase’s board.

Legacy
Steve Coll describes Raymond as "notoriously skeptical about climate change and disliked government interference at any level".

Lee Raymond was at the helm of Exxon while it remained one of the last large companies to omit gay employees in its anti-discrimination policy. He was also at the helm during the takeover of Mobil, when the new Exxon-Mobil corporation rescinded Mobil's pre-existing anti-discrimination policy. HR policy was eventually updated in 2015 to include a prohibition on discrimination against gay employees, but from 1999-2014 the board annually rejected a resolution brought by shareholders to compel the company to implement a non-discrimination policy.

His son, John T. Raymond, is active in the oil and gas industry. John partnered with the Jim Flores and Paul Allen-backed Vulcan Capital in the buyout of Plains Resources.

Lee Raymond received the Woodrow Wilson Award from the Woodrow Wilson International Center for Scholars of the Smithsonian Institution for Corporate Citizenship during a dinner held in his honor in Dallas, Texas in early 2003.

Awards and honors
1998 Golden Plate Award of the American Academy of Achievement
2003 Woodrow Wilson Award from the Woodrow Wilson International Center for Scholars
2006 Texas Business Hall of Fame
2006 Exxon Mobil Corporation Endows Scholarship Awards to Honor Lee R. Raymond
2018 Honorary Lifetime Achievement Award for the Advancement of International Energy Policy & Diplomacy

References

External links 

Articles by Lee Raymond
 Article: World Energy Magazine - The Future of Energy in Emerging Asia
 Article: World Energy Magazine - The United Kingdom Leads Europe’s Growing Import Demand

Other
SEC-filed Proxy Statement detailing Raymond's retirement compensation, SEC (US Securities and Exchange Commission)
Enemy of the Planet New York Times piece by Paul Krugman, 17 April 2006
Scientists offered cash to dispute climate study Guardian article by Ian Sample, 2 February 2007

1938 births
Living people
American chief executives
American Enterprise Institute
American chemical engineers
ExxonMobil people
University of Minnesota College of Science and Engineering alumni
University of Wisconsin–Madison College of Engineering alumni
Directors of JPMorgan Chase
Members of the United States National Academy of Engineering
Minnesota CEMS
Honorary Citizens of Singapore